Woodley is a suburb in the Metropolitan Borough of Stockport, Greater Manchester, England. It is situated on the east side of the Peak Forest Canal, next to Bredbury, Romiley and the boundary with Tameside, at Gee Cross.

Historically part of Cheshire, the name means "a clearing in the wood" because the area contains a lot of woodland.

Religion

Transport

Railway
Woodley railway station is on the Hope Valley line; on a loop which stretches from Ashburys to Romiley, via Guide Bridge but by-passing Bredbury.

Services run half-hourly between Manchester Piccadilly and Rose Hill Marple on Mondays to Saturdays; there is no service on Sundays.

Buses
Route 330 runs regularly between Stockport and Ashton-under-Lyne via Bredbury, Hyde and Dukinfield.
Route 382 runs between Stockport and Woodley, via Bredbury and Romiley.

Roads
Woodley is situated close to J25 of the M60 Manchester orbital motorway.  The A560 passes through the suburb, which runs between Altrincham, Stockport, Gee Cross and Hattersley.

Canal

The Peak Forest Canal runs through Woodley, which features a long tunnel under the A560.

Education
Woodley has two primary schools:
 Woodley Primary School, previously called Woodley Infant and Junior schools. The school also ran a nursery which was next to (and connected to) Woodley Methodist Church.
 Greave Primary School, in Greave, on the border with Romiley.

Primary school aged children can also attend a nearby school in neighbouring Bredbury: St. Marks C. of E. Primary School on Redhouse Lane; this was the original infant and junior school for the locality.

After education in these primary schools, most students feed to either Werneth School, Marple Hall School or Harrytown Catholic High School for their secondary education.

Community

Woodley is home to four pubs: The White Hart, The Railway, The Navigation and The Woodley Arms. These pubs form the start of the Ring of Death, a pub crawl that takes in Woodley, Bredbury, Romiley and ends in Greave. The Ring of Death used to consist of twenty pubs in total and was a traditional marathon undertaken by locals at Christmas.

Woodley was also home to the recently transformed snooker palace which, following the removal of its snooker tables, became the Palace Bar; it is now closed and up for sale.

Sport
Woodley is the home of semi-professional football club Stockport Town.

Stockport Sports Village is located in Woodley; facilities include a gym, sauna, football pitches and fitness courses.

Woodley Cricket Club play their home matches at their facilities on High Lane.

Mills of Woodley 
Still existent
Woodley Mill
Thorn Works (formerly Middle Mill)
Wellington Works (formerly Botany Mill)

Demolished
Wood Mill, Woodley
Top Mill
Star Mill

See also

Listed buildings in Bredbury and Romiley

References

External links

Areas of Greater Manchester
Geography of the Metropolitan Borough of Stockport